Caucourt is a commune in the Pas-de-Calais department in the Hauts-de-France region of France.

Geography
The "Blanche" stream rises here, forming the source of the Lawe river.

Population

Places of interest
 The church of St.Pierre, dating from the sixteenth century.
 The war memorial.
 An old watermill.

See also
Communes of the Pas-de-Calais department

References

External links

 Official municipality website 
 A website about the Commune 

Communes of Pas-de-Calais